The following is a list of ammunition fired by the 125 mm smoothbore gun series used in the T-64, T-72, T-80, M-84, T-90, PT-91, T-14 Armata, and other tanks derived from those designs, as well as the 2A45 Sprut anti-tank gun.

APFSDS-T
Armour-piercing fin-stabilized discarding sabot (APFSDS) using a sabot and tracer (APFSDS-T). Typically used against other modern tanks.

There are different ways to measure penetration value. NATO uses the 50% (This means that 50% of the shell had to go through the plate), while the Soviet and Russian standard is higher (80% had to go through). According to authorities like Paul Lakowski, the difference in performance can reach as much as 8%

3VBM3/3BM9/10
Entered service in 1962. The projectile is Maraging steel.
 Country of origin: Soviet Union
 Projectile dimension: 410 mm 10: 1 L/d
 Projectile weight (including sabot): 5.67 kg
 Projectile weight: 3.6 kg
 Muzzle velocity: 1800 m/s
 Muzzle energy: 5.8 MJ
 Penetration: 245 mm at 0° at 2000 m, 100 mm - 110 mm at 60° at 2000 m, (energy at 2000 m is 4.2 MJ)

3VBM6/3BM12/13
Entered service (estimated) in 1968. Essentially the same as the 3BM9 projectile with a tungsten carbide plug.
 Country of origin: Soviet Union
 Projectile dimension: 410 mm 10: 1 L/d
 Projectile weight (including sabot): 5.67 kg
 Projectile weight: 3.6 kg
 Muzzle velocity: 1800 m/s
 Muzzle energy: 5.8 MJ
 Penetration: 280 mm at 0° at 2000 m, 130 mm at 60° at 2000 m, (energy at 2000 m is 4.2 MJ)

3VBM7/3BM15/16

Entered service (estimated 1972). A slightly longer 3BM12 projectile.
 Country of origin: Soviet Union
 Projectile dimension: 435 mm 12: 1 L/d
 Projectile weight (including sabot): 5.9 kg
 Projectile weight: 3.9 kg including 2.9 kg and 0.27 kg tungsten carbide plug
 Muzzle velocity: 1785 m/s
 Muzzle energy: 6.2 MJ
 Certified penetration: 310 mm at 0° at 2000 m, 135 mm - 150 mm at 60° at 2000 m

3VBM8/3BM17/18
Entered service (estimated 1972). An export version of the 3BM-15 without the tungsten carbide plug. Hence, it is an all-steel penetrator with inferior performance. 
 Country of origin: Soviet Union
 Projectile dimension: 450 mm 12: 1 L/d
 Projectile weight (including sabot): 5.9 kg
 Projectile weight: 3.9 kg
 Muzzle velocity: 1780 m/s
 Muzzle energy: 6.2 MJ
 Certified penetration: 310 mm at 0° at 2000 m

3VBM9/3BM22/23
Entered service 1976. Tungsten carbide penetrator core sheathed in steel. Enlarged cap help to increase positive normalization and hold a much larger penetrator.
 Country of origin: Soviet Union
 Projectile dimension: 400 mm 11: 1 L/d
 Projectile weight (including sabot): 6.55 kg
 Projectile weight: 4.485 kg
 Muzzle velocity: 1785 m/s
 Muzzle energy: 7.0 MJ
 Penetration: 380 mm at 0° at 2000 m, 170 mm - 180 mm at 60° at 2000 m

3VBM10/3BM29/30
Entered service 1982. Depleted uranium-nickel-iron alloy sheathed in steel.
 Country of origin: Soviet Union
 Projectile dimension: 450 mm 12: 1 L/d - including 250 mm core
 Projectile weight (including sabot): 6.55 kg
 Projectile weight: 4.85 kg
 Muzzle velocity: 1700 m/s
 Muzzle energy: 7.0 MJ
 Penetration: 440 mm at 0° at 2000 m, 210 mm at 60° at 2000 m

3VBM11/3BM26/27
Entered service 1983. Tungsten-nickel-iron alloy penetrator core sheathed in steel. Utilised new 4Zh63 high-energy propelling charge. Penetrator is base-installed to prevent deflection during penetration against multi-layered composite armour. Improved penetrator cap made of aluminium alloy.
 Country of origin: Soviet Union
 Projectile dimension: 395 mm 11: 1 L/d
 Projectile weight (including sabot): 7.05 kg
 Projectile weight: 4.8 kg
 Muzzle velocity: 1720 m/s
 Muzzle energy: 7.5 MJ
 Penetration: 420 mm at 0° at 2000 m, 200 mm at 60° at 2000 m

3VBM13/3BM32/33 (3BM32 "Vant")
Entered service in 1985. The projectile is an integrated depleted uranium-nickel-zinc alloy penetrator.
 Country of origin: Soviet Union
 Projectile dimension: 380 mm 13: 1 L/d
 Projectile weight (including sabot): 7.05 kg
 Projectile weight: 4.85 kg
 Muzzle velocity: 1700 m/s
 Muzzle energy: 7.0 MJ
 Penetration 540 mm at 0° at 2000 m, 250 mm at 60° at 2000 m

3VBM17/3BM42 (3BM42 "Mango")

Entered service in 1986. The projectile is double tungsten alloy rod sheathed in low melting point alloy covered with steel, intended to increase penetration against non-explosive reactive armour (NERA) such as Chobham armour.
 Country of origin: Soviet Union
 Projectile dimension: 452 mm 15: 1 L/d
 Round weight: 20.4 kg
 Projectile weight: 4.85 kg 
 Projectile weight (including sabot): 7.05 kg
 Muzzle velocity: 1715 m/s
 Muzzle energy: 7.1 MJ
 Penetration: 
~430 mm at 0° at 2000 m, 230 mm at 60° at 2000 m (with 3VBM17 projectile)

3VBM19/3BM42M (3BM44M "Lekalo")
Entered service in 1994.
Uses an improved penetrator and a new sabot. Reported to be tungsten alloy. 
 Country of origin: Russia
 Projectile dimension: 570 mm 25: 1 L/d
 Round weight: ? kg
 Projectile weight (including sabot): 6.95 kg
 Projectile weight: 4.6 kg
 Muzzle velocity: 1750 m/s
 Muzzle energy: 7.04 MJ 
 Penetration: 650 mm at 0° at 2000 m

3VBM20/3BM46 (3BM48 "Svinets")
Entered service in 1991.
Uses a new advanced high elongation uranium monoblock penetrator.
 Country of origin: Soviet Union
 Projectile dimension: 546 mm 21.84: 1 L/d
 Round weight: ? ;kg
 Projectile weight (including sabot): ?
 Projectile weight: 4.85 kg
 Muzzle velocity: 1700 m/s
 Muzzle energy: 7.4 MJ
 Penetration: 510 mm at 0° at 2000 m, 300 mm at 60° at 2000 m

3VBM23/3BM60 (3BM60 "Svinets-2")
Entered service : 2016.
Uses a new sabot design, and a Tungsten Alloy penetrator of increased length compared to prior generation Russian APFSDS ammunition. Used on 2A46M-4/5 with new autoloader. 
 Country of origin: Russia
 Projectile dimension: 735 mm
 Round weight: ? kg
 Projectile weight (including sabot): ?
 Projectile weight: estimated 8.8 kg
 Muzzle velocity: 1650 m/s?
 Muzzle energy: 12.1 MJ?
 Penetration: 320-330 mm at 60° at 2000 m, ~650 mm at 0° at 2000 m

3VBM22/3BM59 (3BM59 "Svinets-1")
Entered service: 2016.
Uses a new sabot design, and a new depleted uranium penetrator. Used on 2A46M-5 with new autoloader.   
 Country of origin: Russia
 Projectile dimension: ?
 Round weight: 22.0 kg
 Projectile weight (including sabot): 8.4 kg
 Projectile weight: 8.8 kg (Estimated)
 Muzzle velocity: 1660 m/s
 Muzzle energy: 12.1 MJ
 Penetration: ~740mm 0° at 2000 meters

3VBM?/3BM69 "Vacuum-1"
Uses a new sabot. Reported to be uranium alloy. For use on 2A82-1M cannon on T-14 Armata.
 Country of origin: Russia
 Projectile dimension: ?
 Round weight: ?
 Projectile weight (including sabot): ?
 Projectile weight: estimated 11 kg
 Muzzle velocity: 2050 m/s
 Muzzle energy: 15–24 MJ (described 15MJ probably refer to high-explosive shell)
 Penetration: 1,000 mm at 0° at 2000m

3VBM?/3BM70 "Vacuum-2"
Uses a new sabot. Identical to 3BM69 in dimensions, the difference being that the projectile is made out of tungsten.
 Country of origin: Russia
 Projectile dimension: ?
 Round weight: ?
 Projectile weight (including sabot): ?
 Muzzle velocity: ?
 Muzzle energy: ?
 Penetration: 800~1000 mm at 0° at 2000 m

DTW-125 
Second-generation Chinese sabot round. "II" and "II M" are the export versions with slightly reduced penetration. "BT-4" is a newer export version with equivalent penetration for the VT-4.
 Country of origin: People's Republic of China
 Projectile dimension: 680 mm
 Round weight: 22.6 kg
 Projectile weight (including sabot): 11.8 kg
 Muzzle velocity: 1700 m/s
 Muzzle energy: ?
 Penetration: 600 mm at 0° at 2000 m

DTC10-125
Third-generation Chinese sabot round unveiled in 2017. Subject of a data leak on War Thunder forum in June 2022 (leaked data is used here). This performance value is identical to value shown on Chinese state media, CCTV7.
 Country of origin: People's Republic of China
 Projectile dimension: ~705 mm
 Round weight: ?
 Projectile weight (including sabot): ?
 Muzzle velocity: 1760 m/s
 Muzzle energy: ?
 Penetration: 220 mm (LOS 680 mm RHA equivalent) RHA at 71.12° at 2000 m, ≥90% of the time

TAPNA
Produced by MSM Group in Slovakia. The penetrator is made from tungsten alloy. 
 Country of origin: Slovakia
 Projectile dimension: ?
 Round weight: 20 kg
 Projectile weight (including sabot): 10,3 kg
 Muzzle velocity: 1690 m/s
 Muzzle energy: ?
 Penetration: 550 mm RHA at 2000 m

HEAT-FS
High-explosive anti-tank (HEAT) fin stabilized (HEAT-FS) rounds. Typically used against lighter or older tanks and armoured personnel carriers.

3VBK7/3BK12
Entered service 1962.
 Country of origin: Soviet Union
 Projectile dimension: 680 mm
 Projectile weight: 19 kg
 Max dispersion: 0.21 mil (0.21 mrad)
 Muzzle velocity: 905 m/s
 Charge: shaped charge, steel liner, A-IX-1 (RDX phlegmatized with 5% wax), I-238 detonator
 Penetration: 420 mm RHA at 0 degrees

3BK12M
Entered service 1968, replacing steel liner with a copper liner. "M" means медь ("copper" in Russian) Uses 3V-15 detonator. Due to Soviet Union's copper economize policy production of the model is limited. Penetration performance claimed to be 10% higher than steel liner version.
 Country of origin: Soviet Union

3VBK10/3BK14
Entered service 1968.
 Country of origin: Soviet Union
 Projectile dimension: 680 mm
 Projectile weight: 19 kg
 Max dispersion: 0.21 mil (0.21 mrad)
 Muzzle velocity: 905 m/s
 Charge: shaped charge, steel liner, Okfol (phlegmatized HMX with 5% plasticizer) ; 3V-15 detonator
 Charge weight: 1.62 kg
 Penetration: 450 mm RHA at 0 degrees

3BK14M

Improved version, replacing steel liner with a copper liner.

3VBK16/3BK18
Entered service estimated 1975. Introduced wave-shaping booster.
 Country of origin: Soviet Union
 Round weight: 29.0 kg
 Projectile dimension: 680 mm
 Projectile weight: 19 kg
 Max dispersion: 0.21 mil (0.21 mrad)
 Muzzle velocity: 905 m/s
 Charge: shaped charge, steel liner, Okfol (phlegmatized HMX with 5% plasticizer); 3V-15 detonator
 Penetration: 500 mm RHA at 0 degrees

3BK18M
Improved warhead. Entered service estimated 1978, replacing steel liner with a copper liner. Improved wave-shaping booster.
 Country of origin: Soviet Union
 Projectile weight: 19.02 kg
 Muzzle velocity: 905 m/s
 Penetration: 550 mm RHA at 0 degrees

3VBK17/3BK21
Entered service estimated 1980. Enhancements to improve reliability of the copper jet formation.
 Country of origin: Soviet Union
 Projectile dimension: 680 mm
 Projectile weight: 19 kg
 Max dispersion: 0.21 mil (0.21 mrad)
 Muzzle velocity: 905 m/s
 Charge: shaped charge, copper liner, Okfol (phlegmatized HMX with 5% plasticizer); 3V-15 detonator
 Penetration: 550 mm RHA at 0 degrees

3BK21B
Entered service estimated 1982. "Material B" depleted uranium alloy liner to enhance penetration of advanced composite armours like Chobham.
 Country of origin: Soviet Union
 Projectile dimension: 680 mm
 Projectile weight: 19 kg
 Muzzle velocity: 905 m/s
 Penetration: 750 mm RHA at 0 degrees

3VBK21/3BK25
Entered service estimated 1985.
 Country of origin: Soviet Union
 Muzzle velocity: 905 m/s

3VBK25/3BK29 "Breyk"

Entered service estimated 1988. A new type of explosive-filling was applied, which improved focusing of the jet stream.
 Country of origin: Soviet Union
 Round weight: 28.4 kg
 Projectile dimension: 680 mm
 Projectile weight: 18.4 kg
 Muzzle velocity: 915 m/s
 Penetration: 350mm to 400mm RHA at 60 degree tandem-charge

3VBK25M/3BK29M
 Country of origin: Soviet Union
 Projectile weight: 18.4 kg
 Charge weight: 1.62 kg
 Muzzle velocity: 915 m/s
 Penetration: Estimated at 800 mm tandem-charge HEAT

3VBK27/3BK31 "Start"
First seen publicly in 1998. Reportedly a triple charge warhead intended to reduce efficiency of NERA elements.
 Country of origin: Russia
 Projectile weight: 18.4 kg
 Charge weight: 1.62 kg
 Muzzle velocity: 915 m/s
 Penetration: Estimated at 800 mm (triple charge HEAT)

HE-frag-FS
High explosive fragmentation fin stabilised. General purpose rounds, for use against infantry, bunkers and light vehicles and other "soft" targets.

3VOF22/3OF19

Entered service in 1962. Uses the 3V-21 detonator (mass = 0.431 kg, reliability = 0.98). The 90% lethal zone for infantry is reported to be 40 m wide and 20 m deep.
 Country of origin: Soviet Union
 Round weight: 33.0 kg
 Projectile weight: 23.0 kg
 Muzzle velocity: 850 m/s
 Max dispersion: 0.23 mil (0.23 mrad)
 Charge weight: 3.148 kg
 Charge: TNT

3VOF36/3OF26

Entered service in 1970. Uses the 3V-21 detonator (mass = 0.431 kg, reliability = 0.98). The projectile creates between 600 and 2,000 fragments. The body is made up of 45Kh1 steel or 60S2 high-fragmentation steel for modern projectiles. Modern projectiles creates up to 2,500 effective fragments.
 Country of origin: Soviet Union
 Round weight: 33.0 kg
 Projectile weight: 23.0 kg
 Muzzle velocity: 850 m/s
 Max dispersion: 0.23 mil (0.23 mrad)
 Charge weight: 3.4  kg 
 Charge: A-IX-2 (73% RDX, 23% aluminium powder, phlegmatized with 4% wax) 3.4 kg

3VOF128/3OF82
Entered service in 2014. Uses the 3VM-18 programmable detonator. The projectile contains 450 tungsten rods, each weighing 3 grams and creates 2,500 fragments in a cone formation ahead of the projectile when air burst mode is set. Air burst mode for use against infantry, light vehicles and helicopters, delayed mode use against bunkers and other constructions. Is currently used on the 2A46M-5 gun, mounted on the T-90M.
 Country of origin: Russia
 Round weight: 33.0 kg
 Projectile weight: 23.0 kg
 Muzzle velocity: 850 m/s
 Max dispersion: 0.23 mil (0.23 mrad)
 Charge weight: 3.0 kg
 Charge: A-IX-2 (73% RDX, 23% aluminium powder, phlegmatized with 4% wax) 3.0 kg

Shrapnel-FS

3VSh7/3Sh7 "Voron"
Entered service in 1975. Uses the 3VM-17 time detonator. For use against wide area infantry and light vehicles. Time of detonation setting is mechanical, for modernization, the shell fuze could be set automatically by improved "Ainet" systems or "Kalina" systems, which are available on the T-90K commander tank or the regular main battle tanks such as the T-90A, T-90M, T-80UA, and the T-14 Armata main battle tank.
 Country of origin: Soviet Union
 Round weight: 31.3 kg
 Projectile weight: 21.3 kg
 Muzzle velocity: 900 m/s
 Projectiles contain:4,700 flechette weighing 1.26 g each
 Charge weight: 0.08 kg (A-IX-1)

3VSh8/3Sh8 "Ainet"
Entered service in 1988. Uses the 3VM-12 programmable detonator. A part of Remote detonation system "Ainet" on T-80UK commander tank.
 Country of origin: Soviet Union
 Round weight: 31.3 kg
 Projectile weight: 21.3 kg
 Muzzle velocity: 900 m/s
 Projectiles contain: 4,700 flechettes weighing 1.26 g each
 Charge weight: 0.08 kg (A-IX-1)

ATGW/ATGM

9M112 Kobra

The 9K112 Kobra (NATO reporting name is AT-8 Songster) is also fired from the 125 mm main guns of the T-64 and T-80 series of tanks
 Country of origin: Soviet Union
 Projectile weight: 23.2 kg
 Warhead weight: 4.5 kg
 Guidance system: Radio-command guided
 Range: 100 – 4000 m
 Penetration: Estimated at  after ERA tandem-charge HEAT

9M119 Refleks

The 9M119 Svir and 9M119M Refleks (NATO reporting name: AT-11 Sniper) anti-tank guided missile has semi-automatic command to line of sight (SACLOS) laser beam riding guidance and a tandem shaped charge HEAT warhead. It has an effective range of 75 m to 5000 m, and takes 17.6 seconds to reach maximum range.
 Country of origin: Soviet Union
 Projectile weight: 16.5 kg
 Warhead weight: 4.5 kg
 Guidance system: Laser beam riding
 Range: 75 – 5000 m
 Penetration: Estimated at  after ERA tandem charge HEAT

3UBK21 Sprinter
Designed for the 2A82-1M gun on T-14 Armata tanks, the 3UBK21 Sprinter has  millimeter wave semi-automatic command to line of sight (SACLOS) guidance and a tandem shaped-charge HEAT warhead. It has an effective range of 50 m to 12000 m. and can penetrate  of steel rolled homogeneous armour (RHAe) after explosive reactive armour (ERA). It can also engage low-flying air targets such as helicopters.
 Country of origin: Russia
 Projectile weight: ?
 Warhead weight: ?
 Guidance system: millimeter wave
 Range: 50 – 12000 m
 Penetration: Estimated at  after ERA tandem charge HEAT

Guided shell

Sokol-1
The Sokol-1 guided shell is fired from the 125 mm main gun, it borrowed design from the 152mm artillery shell 3OF75 Santimetr-M and both have very similar appearance, but with an added shaped charge cap into its design similar to the M712 Copperhead, intended to defeat heavily armoured targets. It uses the technique that is referred to as the Russian concept of impulse corrections (RCIC), an impulse steering flight control system to correct the projectile's trajectory.
 Country of origin: Russia
 Projectile weight: 23.0 kg
 Muzzle velocity: 850 m/s
 Guidance system: Semi-Active Laser/Passive target contour-based
 Range: 0.1 – 5.0 km（direct fire）12 km（indirect fire）
 Warhead: High-explosive/ penetration shaped charge

3UBK14F1/9M119F1
The 3UBK14F1 guided shell is fired from the 125 mm main gun, its design was modified from 9M119 missile, removing the rocket motor and replacing it with an extra thermobaric warhead, turning it into a guided shell. Its range was decreased to 3.5 km, and it is claimed to have three times the explosive power of regular thermobaric variant 125 mm guided missiles.
 Country of origin: Russia
 Projectile weight: 16.5 kg
 Muzzle velocity: 284 m/s
 Guidance system: Laser beam riding
 Range: 0.1 – 3.5 km
 Warhead: Thermobaric estimated 15 kg TNT equivalent

See also
 2A46 D-81T
 2A45 Sprut
 120×570mm NATO

References

External links
 Vasiliy Fofanov's Modern Russian Armour Page - Extensive information
 Headstamps, Color Codes, Markings - The Russian Ammunition Page - Explosive compositions and designations

Large-caliber cartridges